The Tough Ones is a 1999 Finnish film directed by Aleksi Mäkelä. It was Finland's official Best Foreign Language Film submission at the 72nd Academy Awards, but did not manage to receive a nomination.

Plot
The film starts when Jussi Murikka (Samuli Edelmann), Antti Karhu (Juha Veijonen) and Heikki Grönberg (Teemu Lehtilä) rob a bank together. Antti and Jussi are sent to prison, and five years later they return home. Heikki also returns to Kauhava, as police officer. Antti and Jussi continue their lives as they did before, being violent and committing crimes. Heikki tries to help them, but gets between his old friends and citizens, who try to get rid of the duo. Antti tries few times to change his life, but he fails. The duo starts to sell home made alcohol together with Antti's grandfather, who has been selling it to the citizens for years. When Heikki is forced to take an action, Antti, Jussi and Roope, Antti's little brother, hide and Heikki only finds the grandfather. He doesn't like the way Heikki "betrays his friends" and tries to go after Heikki with his tractor, only getting hit by it and send to the hospital. After he's not there to supervise Antti and Jussi decide to sell alcohol to children, which was strictly forbidden by the grandfather, before leaving the town for good. This leads to Roope's death among five other children: they drive while drunk and end up in car accident. After that the citizens beat Antti and Jussi up and tell them to leave for good. They however refuse to leave, and finally they do something that will put them in prison. The duo tries to flee, and they kill one of the police officers while trying. After that they separate, and Antti gets caught. Jussi still tries to flee, but Heikki finds him and tries to take him to the station. They drive on a bridge when Jussi grabs the wheel and turns it, which makes them fall into the river. At that moment Heikki reveals to Jussi why he's been trying to help them, and he watches while Jussi, handcuffed to the car door, sinks with the car to the river.

Cast
 Samuli Edelmann - Jussi Murikka
 Juha Veijonen - Antti Karhu
 Teemu Lehtilä - Heikki Grönberg
 Kalevi Haapoja - Grandfather Karhu
 Arttu Kapulainen - Roope Karhu
 Sari Havas - Sisko
 Eero Aho - Stig Nenonen
 Pia Latomäki - Paula
 Kari Väänänen - Törnqvist

See also
 List of submissions to the 72nd Academy Awards for Best Foreign Language Film
 List of Finnish submissions for the Academy Award for Best Foreign Language Film

References

External links

1990s Finnish-language films
1999 films
Films directed by Aleksi Mäkelä
1999 crime drama films
Finnish crime drama films